Sarratt Bottom nature Reserve in Hertfordshire is a  biological Site of Special Scientific Interest. The site is a meadow beside the River Chess. It is an example of damp grassland which has been traditionally managed for grazing. There are also areas of swamp and marsh. The main plants in grassland areas include sweet vernal grass and meadow foxtail, and marsh horsetail and common spike-rush are common in damper areas. The site has hedgehogs and a wide variety of wetland birds and invertebrates.

There is no public access but the site can be viewed from Moor Lane. The local planning authority is Three Rivers District Council.

See also
List of Sites of Special Scientific Interest in Hertfordshire

References

Sites of Special Scientific Interest in Hertfordshire
Meadows in Hertfordshire